The Union of Chambers of Turkish Engineers and Architects  is a confederation of all chambers of architects and engineers in Turkey. The union was "established in 1954 by the Law 7303 and the Decree-Laws 66 and 85 amending of the Law 6235" and "is a corporate body and a professional organization defined in the form of a public institution as stated in the Article 135 of the Turkish Constitution." As of end 2013, the union represents 24 chambers with a total membership of 445,365. It is headquartered in Kızılay, Ankara.

Its national leadership states that TMMOB and its member Chambers "accept that the problems of the profession and the colleagues cannot be separated from the general problems of the people and the country" and, therefore, they "are anti-imperialist and oppose the New World Order theories, racism and reactionism", and "implement democratic centralist methods in the formation and implementation of the policies" as listed among "Fundamental Principles" of the organization.

In July 2013 the Justice and Development Party rushed through a bill removing TMMOB's role in approving urban development proposals, apparently in response to TMMOB's support of the 2013 protests in Turkey.

Members

References 

1954 establishments in Turkey
Organizations based in Ankara
Engineering societies based in Turkey
Turkish
Engineers and Architects